This is a sub-article to Muhammad before Medina.

Following the failed attempt from the Meccan polytheists to have those Muslims who were part of the second migration to Abyssinia expelled and handed back to their persecutors, the Meccans tried to negotiated with Muhammad's protector and uncle Abu Talib ibn ‘Abd al-Muttalib, who was still in Mecca with his nephew to have Muhammad ostracized, a significant demand from the Meccans considering that social death would often result in death or slavery in the Pre-Islamic Arabian culture.  

Historical sources do not give the exact date of these two meetings with Abu Talib.

Second deputation
Abu Talib ibn ‘Abd al-Muttalib held significant power in Mecca as the head of the Banu Hashim, and this protection made it impossible to have Muhammad silenced or subjected to the kind of torture meted out against the Muslims without protection. The polytheist Meccan leaders approached Abu Talib again and insisted he put a stop to his nephew, Muhammad's preaching of monotheism, warning that otherwise he would be faced with severe hostility. 

Their enmity and open threats of a breach between Abu Talib's clan, the Banu Hashim and the rest of the Banu Quraish distressed Abu Talib who was aware of the cost that his nephew Muhammad had to pay if deserted . Abu Talib sent for Muhammad and told him the news, "Spare me and yourself and put not burden on me that I can't bear". Muhammad thought that his uncle would let him down and would no longer support him, so he replied: "O my uncle! by God if they put the sun in my right hand and the moon in my left on condition that I abandon this course, until God has made me victorious, or I perish therein, I would not abandon it." Muhammad got up, and as he turned away, his uncle called back and then said "Go and preach what you please, for by God I will never forsake you.". Abu Talib then recited two lines of verse with meanings of full support to Muhammad.

Third deputation
Realizing that Muhammad would not relent and that Abu Talib was not to forsake his nephew even when his clan was threatened, they tried and arranged for a third deputation. They brought Ammarah ibn Walid, the son of the powerful and rich war-clan leader Walid ibn al-Mughira and  brother of the undefeated general Khalid ibn al-Walid and said:

Abu Talib turned down all their offers and challenged them to do whatever they pleased.

Another account quotes: 

He then recited a poem.

This is included in the Sirah Rasul Allah of Ibn Hisham.

References

External links
http://www.al-islam.org/restatement/10.htm
http://ahmadiyya.ws/text/books/mali/muhammadprophet/ch04stormyopposition_pf.shtml

Life of Muhammad